The Kenyon Bridge, also known as the Blacksmith Shop Bridge, is a historic covered bridge spanning Mill Brook near Town House Road in Cornish, New Hampshire, United States. Built in 1882, it is one of New Hampshire's few surviving 19th-century covered bridges. It was listed on the National Register of Historic Places in 1978.

Description and history 
It spans Mill Brook in a roughly east-west orientation. The bridge rests on dry-laid stone abutments. The bridge's multiple kingpost trusses are sheltered by a sheet metal roof, with vertical plank siding covering the lower 1/3 of the trusses. Each truss consists of 28 panel sections between 29 posts.

The bridge was built in 1882 by James Frederick Tasker (1826–1903), a local builder well known for his bridges. Its historic name, Blacksmith Shop Bridge, derives from a shop nearby owned by blacksmith John Fellows. It underwent a major rehabilitation in 1963. It is now closed to vehicular traffic, but open to pedestrians.

Images

See also

Other covered bridges in Cornish
Blow-Me-Down Covered Bridge
Cornish-Windsor Covered Bridge
Dingleton Hill Covered Bridge

Covered bridges in nearby West Windsor, Vermont
Best's Covered Bridge
Bowers Covered Bridge

Other bridges elsewhere
List of bridges documented by the Historic American Engineering Record in New Hampshire
List of bridges on the National Register of Historic Places in New Hampshire
List of bridges on the National Register of Historic Places in Vermont
List of covered bridges in Vermont
List of crossings of the Connecticut River
List of New Hampshire covered bridges
National Register of Historic Places listings in Sullivan County, New Hampshire

References

External links

New Hampshire DHR page on the bridge (dated info)

Road bridges on the National Register of Historic Places in New Hampshire
Bridges completed in 1882
Bridges in Sullivan County, New Hampshire
Historic American Engineering Record in New Hampshire
National Register of Historic Places in Sullivan County, New Hampshire
Cornish, New Hampshire
Wooden bridges in New Hampshire
Covered bridges in New Hampshire
King post truss bridges in the United States